Aporhina is a genus of beetles belonging to the family Brentidae.

The species of this genus are found in Eastern Malesia and Australia.

Species
Species:

 Aporhina alboguttata (Snellen van Vollenhoven, 1866)
 Aporhina aruensis (Heller, 1896)
 Aporhina aspericollis (Heller, 1910)
 Aporhina assimilis (Györffyi, 1917)
 Aporhina australis (Heller, 1896)
 Aporhina bennigseni (Wagner, 1912)
 Aporhina biroi (Györffyi, 1917)
 Aporhina bispinosa Boisduval, 1835
 Aporhina exarmata (Heller, 1905)
 Aporhina granosispina (Heller, 1925)
 Aporhina helleri (Wagner, 1912)
 Aporhina inermis (Heller, 1897)
 Aporhina insignis (Heller, 1905)
 Aporhina levigata (Heller, 1925)
 Aporhina magdalenae (Györffyi, 1917)
 Aporhina massutei (Heller, 1901)
 Aporhina mesospila (Györffyi, 1917)
 Aporhina mutica (Heller, 1925)
 Aporhina nitens (Snellen van Vollenhoven, 1866)
 Aporhina obtusispina (Heller, 1925)
 Aporhina pulchra Oberprieler in Sforzi and Bartolozzi, 2004
 Aporhina richteri (Faust, 1892)

References

Brentidae